Coprinopsis picacea is a species of fungus in the family Psathyrellaceae. It is commonly called magpie inkcap fungus. It was first described in 1785 by French mycologist Jean Baptiste François Pierre Bulliard in 1785 as Agaricus picaceus.

The species can sometimes be confused with the edible Coprinus comatus.

Distribution 
The magpie inkcap  is common in Europe and Australia. In Europe, the area extends from Great Britain and France in the west to Poland, Hungary and Romania in the east and south to Spain and the Balearic Islands, Italy and Greece and to Germany and Denmark in the north.

Description 
The cap is initially egg-shaped, reaching a width of 7 cm. Later it opens up and takes on a bell shape that is up to 8 cm wide. The cap is serrated and colored white on very young mushrooms. It breaks open with increasing age, so that the beige to dark brown background emerges. Remnants of the white, grayish to cream-colored velum remain on the cap as flakes, giving the impression of woodpecker or magpie plumage. With age, the brim of the cap rolls up and dissolves. The lamellae are very close and are initially greyish-white, then pink to gray in color. Eventually they melt, dripping and black, giving it the name inkcap. The stalk is whitish and 12–20 (–30) cm long and 6–15 mm thick. It is hollow and not very stable, slightly tapered towards the top and covered with scales or fine fibers that form a snake towards the base. The flesh is whitish with a fibrous, watery consistency and sometimes has an unpleasant smell of moth powder. The taste is also unpleasant.

The species is inedible and causes digestive upset.

Microscopic features 
The elliptical, dark brown spores are 14–18.5 × 10–13  µm in size. The Cheilo- and pleuro Zystiden are bubbles or bag-to tubular. They are up to 150 µm long and 50 µm wide.

See also
List of Coprinopsis species

References

picacea
Fungi of Europe
Fungi of North America
Fungi described in 1785

Inedible fungi